Theater venues in the US state of Colorado include:
Arvada
Arvada Center for the Arts and Humanities
Boulder:
Chautauqua Auditorium
University of Colorado at Boulder runs several theaters, and hosts the annual Colorado Shakespeare Festival.
Denver:
The Aurora Fox
The Avenue Theater is located four blocks from Downtown Denver, providing high-class performances.
Denver Center for the Performing Arts is the second largest performing arts center in the US.
The E-vent Center
Germinal Stage Denver
Next Stage Denver
The Theater Off Broadway is located four blocks south of Downtown Denver, in the Santa Fe Arts District.
Fort Collins:
Bas Bleu Theatre Company
Littleton:
Town Hall Arts Center

See also
Theater in the United States
Phamaly Theatre Company has performed at numerous Denver venues since 1989.

External links
Colorado Theatre Guilds - an organization dedicated to the promotion of the theatre arts in the state of Colorado

Colorado
Theatres